Pat Hayhurst was an American politician from Arizona.  He served a single term in the Arizona State Senate during the 6th Arizona State Legislature, holding one of the two seats from Pima County.

Biography

He was the editor of the Southwest Labor Record.  He married Ramona Carljohn in Tombstone, Arizona on January 1, 1923.

He ran for the Democrat nomination for the Arizona State Senate from Pima County.  He and Harry Drachman finished 1–2, respectively, in the Democrat primary, and went on to win in November's general election.  He did not seek re-election in 1924.

References

Arizona politicians
Democratic Party Arizona state senators
20th-century American politicians